Architectural animation is a short architectural movie created on a computer. A computer-generated building is created along with landscaping and sometimes moving people and vehicles. Unlike an architectural rendering, which is a single image from a single point of view, an architectural animation is generally a series of hundreds or even thousands of still images played simultaneously in order to produce a video. When these images are assembled and played back, they produce a movie effect much like a real movie camera except all images are artificially created by computer. It is possible to add a computer-created environment around the building to enhance reality and to better convey its relationship to the surrounding area; this can all be done before the project is built giving designers and stakeholders a realistic view of the completed project. Architectural renderings are often used along with architectural animation.

History
The first use of a 3D hidden-line removal movie depicting an architectural street scene was in 1976 by Jonathan Ingram.   It shows the planned Crown Courts in Hobart in 1976 and was used for planning approval. The buildings exist today.

Usage
Commercial demand for computer-generated rendering is on the rise. There is a large growing demand of architectural visualization services worldwide. This has mainly been accelerated by the advancements in computing technology and allowing architectural animations to become cheaper. There are numerous real-time rendering engines that differ from the traditional method of multiple stitched still images together. This allows architectural animation to be far cheaper and less labor-intensive. However, it usually doesn't have the same photo realism. Typically, members of the AIA (American Institute of Architects) and NAHB (National Association of Home Builders) prefer to use 3D animations and single renderings for their customers before starting on a construction project. These professionals often find their clients are unable to grasp the complexity and spatial qualities of large projects without the help of computer generated visual aids. The animations and renderings are usually supplied by small animation studios.

The process 
The process of creating an architectural animation is generally standard across the industry. A storyboard will be created showing the path of the animation, this allows for the project to have a clear scope of work and an estimation of how much time it is going to take. Once complete, the general 3D structure of the animation sequence is created and textures, materials & details are applied. Single still frame images are usually presented to the client at this stage and tweaks are made to the design so the structure, materials and colors are correct. Once this has been accepted by the client the images that form the sequence are created and stitched together, edited and presented with a soundtrack.

Future
Architectural animation is not necessarily the ambition of most small computer rendering firms because of the man hours and computer time that is required to create so many single still images. Although, due to the rapid improvements in software and rendering engines it is going to very prevalent in future. Architectural animations require a larger team of artists and animators than single renderings and a much longer time frame is required to complete an animation project. However, many architectural firms are now using architectural animation because it attracts investors and customers who may not know much about building designs and can prefer visualization rather than technical drawings to see the buildings look and features. Architectural animation is considered to have a bright future ahead as more and more architects and real estate developers are including computer animations in their marketing programs.

See also
Computer animation
3D computer graphics
Architectural rendering

References

External links
American Institute of Architects Official website
National Association of Home Builders Official website

Architectural design
Computer-aided design